The 2017 KML Playoffs is the final phase of the 2016–17 KML season. The playoffs began on 10 April and ended on 22 May. The tournament concluded with Kalev/Cramo defeating AVIS UTILITAS Rapla 4 games to 0 in the finals. Branko Mirković was named KML Finals MVP.

Bracket

Quarterfinals
The quarterfinals are best-of-five series.

Kalev/Cramo v Rakvere Tarvas/Palmse Metall

University of Tartu v TLÜ/Kalev

AVIS UTILITAS Rapla v Valga-Valka/Maks & Moorits

BC Pärnu Sadam v TTÜ

Semifinals
The quarterfinals are best-of-five series.

Kalev/Cramo v BC Pärnu Sadam

University of Tartu v AVIS UTILITAS Rapla

Third place games
The third place games are best-of-five series.

University of Tartu v BC Pärnu Sadam

Finals
The finals are best-of-seven series.

Kalev/Cramo v AVIS UTILITAS Rapla

References

External links
Official website

Korvpalli Meistriliiga playoffs
playoffs